Kix Brooks is the first solo studio album by American country music artist Kix Brooks. It was released on Capitol Nashville in 1989, a year before he joined Ronnie Dunn in the duo Brooks & Dunn. The album was re-released in 1993 on compact disc via Liberty Records. It includes the single "Sacred Ground," which was a minor hits for Brooks on the country charts, and a new version of "Baby, When Your Heart Breaks Down", which was originally released as a single in 1983.

"Sacred Ground" was later covered by McBride & the Ride on their 1992 album Sacred Ground. McBride & the Ride's version peaked at #2 on the Billboard Hot Country Singles & Tracks (now Hot Country Songs) charts.

Track listing
"Highways and Heartaches" (Kix Brooks, Chris Waters) - 4:05
"Way Up North Around Shreveport" (Brooks, Don Cook) - 2:45
"There's a Telephone Ringing" (Brooks, Alan Laney, Kyle Young) - 4:11
"She Does the Walk On By" (Brooks, Gary Nicholson) - 3:02
"The River" (Brooks, Russell Smith) - 3:13
"Baby, When Your Heart Breaks Down" (Brooks) - 3:02
"The Story of My Life" (Brooks, Roger Murrah) - 4:02
"Sacred Ground" (Brooks, Vernon Rust) - 2:51
"A Little Magic on My Mind" (Brooks, Lewis Anderson) - 3:07
"I'm On to You" (Brooks, Waters, Tom Shapiro) - 3:24
"The Last Rodeo" (Brooks, Wally Wilson) - 3:19

Personnel
Kix Brooks - lead vocals, background vocals
Sam Bush - mandolin
Pat Jacobs - drums
Terry McMillan - harmonica, percussion
Edgar Meyer - bowed bass
Danny Milliner - bass guitar, background vocals
Matt Rollings - accordion
Brent Rowan - acoustic guitar, electric guitar
Dan Seals - background vocals
Hassell Teekell - piano, keyboards, Hammond B-3 organ
Dennis Wilson - background vocals
Wally Wilson - piano

References

1989 debut albums
Kix Brooks albums
Capitol Records albums